Cynthia Phaneuf (born January 16, 1988) is a Canadian former competitive figure skater. She is the 2004 Four Continents silver medallist, 2004 Skate Canada International champion, 2004 Skate America silver medallist, a two-time (2004, 2011) Canadian national champion, and a four-time (2005, 2009, 2010, 2012) Canadian silver medallist. She finished in fifth place at the 2010 World Championships and represented Canada at the 2010 Winter Olympics.

Career
Cynthia Phaneuf began skating at age four after watching her cousin skating. She landed her first triple, a salchow, at the age of eleven.

Phaneuf was coached by Annie Barabé and Sophie Richard in Contrecœur, Quebec from the age of nine until November 2011. Her programs were choreographed by David Wilson. In domestic Canadian competitions, she represented CPA Sorel.

Phaneuf withdrew from the 2005 Skate Canada International due to a minor stress fracture in her right ankle. Considered a threat to qualify for the 2006 Canadian Olympic team due to her two previous national medals, she was forced to withdraw from the 2006 Canadian Championships (the Olympic qualifying competition) due to an injury to her right knee. In 2007, she earned a spot on the Canadian ladies' world team by finishing fourth in that year's national championships.

In 2008, she continued her comeback with a third place showing in the national championships, and a seventh place at the Four Continents Championships.

In 2010, at the World Championships, she placed fifth. She was 4th in the free program and 8th in the short program. Had she scored 1.09 more points, she would have won a bronze medal.

During the 2010–11 season, she placed fourth in her two Grand Prix events. At the 2011 Canadian Championships, she won her second national title.

In November 2011, Phaneuf left Quebec and longtime coaches Annie Barabé and Sophie Richard to move to Toronto to train with Brian Orser. Phaneuf won the silver medal at the 2012 Canadian Championships, second to Amelie Lacoste by 1.57 points. At the 2012 Four Continents, the two skaters competed for a berth to the 2012 World Championships – Phaneuf finished 0.18 points behind Lacoste.

In July 2012, it was reported that Phaneuf had a stress fracture in her back. On September 26, 2012, Phaneuf announced her retirement from competitive skating. She stated, "I've done everything I wanted to. [...] I'm ready to move on."

Personal life
Cynthia is the daughter of Lucie (nee Beaudoin) and Barrie Phaneuf (1966-2001). She has two living siblings - Wyatt and Sébastien, and two deceased - Cedric (d. 1997) and Penelopie (d. 1998). Phaneuf met hockey player Maxime Talbot in Montreal, where they shared the same massage therapist, and they began dating in 2012. Following her retirement from skating, Phaneuf moved to Philadelphia, where Talbot was playing for the NHL, and she began coaching at Isabelle Brasseur's skating school there. After Talbot was traded to the Colorado Avalanche in October 2013, Phaneuf moved with him to Denver, Colorado. Phaneuf and Talbot married on July 11, 2014. They have three children, as of 2019. Phaneuf is a fourth cousin of Canadian ice hockey player Dion Phaneuf.

Programs

Competitive highlights 

GP: Grand Prix; JGP: Junior Grand Prix

References

External links

 Official site
 Cynthia Phaneuf at Skate Canada
 

1988 births
Canadian expatriate sportspeople in the United States
Canadian female single skaters
Figure skaters at the 2010 Winter Olympics
Four Continents Figure Skating Championships medalists
French Quebecers
Living people
Olympic figure skaters of Canada
Sportspeople from Sorel-Tracy
21st-century Canadian women